Kornigou are cakes baked in the shape of antlers to commemorate the god of winter shedding his "cuckold" horns as he returns to his kingdom in the Otherworld. This tradition is typically upheld in Celtic households in Brittany and is enacted during Samhain (Halloween). It is a distinctly Pagan tradition which continues to this day.

The kornigou cake was made by the ancient celts, over 2000 years ago. It is traditionally made of fruit and spices.

References

Additional reading

French cakes
French cuisine
Breton cuisine